Sátão is a municipality in the district Viseu in Portugal. The population in 2011 was 12,444, in an area of 201.94 km2.

The present mayor is Paulo Santos, elected by the Social Democratic Party. The municipal holiday is August 20.

Parishes

Administratively, the municipality is divided into 9 civil parishes (freguesias):
 Águas Boas e Forles
 Avelal
 Ferreira de Aves
 Mioma
 Rio de Moinhos
 Romãs, Decermilo e Vila Longa
 São Miguel de Vila Boa
 Sátão
 Silvã de Cima

Notable people 
 Tobias Figueiredo (born 1994) a footballer with over 150 club caps, plays for Nottingham Forest
 Pedro Rodrigues a footballer with over 150 club caps

References

External links

Towns in Portugal
Populated places in Viseu District
Municipalities of Viseu District
People from Sátão